Lieutenant-General Charles Monson (11 March 1758 – 11 January 1800) was a British Army officer and cricketer who played club matches during the 1780s for the White Conduit Club.

Monson was the third son of John Monson, 2nd Baron Monson. He was the younger brother of cricketer George Monson and was an officer in the British Army.

Monson is recorded only once playing any form of cricket, a match for White Conduit against a Kent team at White Conduit Fields in June 1785. He had an outstanding game as a bowler, taking five wickets (all bowled) in the first innings and enabling his team to win by 304 runs. He scored 29 and 7 with the bat and took six wickets altogether with one catch.

He later rose to the rank of Lieutenant-General before his death in 1800.

References

Bibliography
 

English cricketers
English cricketers of 1701 to 1786
White Conduit Club cricketers
Younger sons of barons
1758 births
1800 deaths